István Vincze ( – ) was a Hungarian mathematician, known for his contributions to number theory, non-parametric statistics, empirical distribution, Cramér–Rao inequality, and information theory. Considered by many, as an expert in theoretical and applied statistics, he was the founder of the Mathematical Institute of the Hungarian Academy, and was the Head of the Statistics Department. He also held the post of professor at Faculty of Science of the Eötvös Loránd University. He wrote over 100 academic papers, authored 10 books, and was a speaker at several conferences, including the Berkeley Symposiums in 1960, 1965, and 1970. He received honors and awards like the Hungarian State Prize and Grauss Ehrenplakette in 1966 and 1978 respectively.

Life

Born in Szeged, Hungary, he graduated from the University of Szeged in 1935.

Around 1950, he founded the Mathematical Institute of the Hungarian Academy, whose director was Alfréd Rényi.

Early in his career, he wrote papers with Paul Erdős, including On the approximation of convex, closed plane curves by multifocal ellipses.

Some of his books that were translated into English are Progress in statistics (1972), and Mathematical methods of statistical quality control (1974).

He participated in conferences and gave seminar talks in the United States, Canada, Argentina, Germany, and China.

He retired from academic teaching in 1980, and died in 1999.

Academic publications

References

1912 births
1999 deaths
Hungarian statisticians
Academic staff of Eötvös Loránd University
20th-century Hungarian mathematicians
Austro-Hungarian mathematicians